Ben Crom Reservoir is a reservoir located in the Mourne Mountains near Kilkeel, County Down, Northern Ireland. Along with Silent Valley Reservoir, which is situated further down the Kilkeel River valley, it supplies water for County Down, surrounding counties and most of Belfast. It was constructed between 1953 and 1957, as the final part of the Mourne scheme to provide water to Belfast which started with the passing of the  Belfast Water Act in 1893.

Ben Crom is a mass gravity dam, meaning it is made of concrete and designed so that the dam's own weight stabilises it against the force of the water. The middle of the structure consists of mass concrete with granite plumbs weighing up to 5 tonnes. The outer face of the dam was made with precast concrete blocks. The project cost approximately £1 million to build and employed 186 people.

In 2012 Northern Ireland Water carried out refurbishments at Ben Crom as part of a £1.6 million scheme to maintain and improve a number of reservoirs in Northern Ireland.

References

Reservoirs in County Down